Matthew John Wise (born November 18, 1975) is an American former professional baseball player. A right-handed pitcher, he played all or parts of eight seasons in Major League Baseball (MLB) between 2000 and 2008. He became the bullpen coach for the Los Angeles Angels in January 2020.

Career

Playing career 
Wise attended Pepperdine University and Cal State Fullerton. In 1995, he played collegiate summer baseball in the Cape Cod Baseball League for the Yarmouth-Dennis Red Sox.

Wise was drafted in the sixth round of the 1997 MLB draft. He made his MLB debut on August 2, 2000 with the Anaheim Angels. After missing the entire 2003 season due to injury, he was released by the Angels and signed with the Milwaukee Brewers. The New York Mets signed Wise to a one-year contract on December 18, 2007.

In 209 career appearances, he had an earned run average (ERA) of 4.23. His two best pitches were an 89-92 mile per hour fastball and a changeup that used deceptive arm action.

Retirement
Wise announced his retirement from MLB at the age of 33 on March 6, 2009.

Coaching career 
Wise was named the bullpen coach for the Los Angeles Angels on January 1, 2020. On February 16, 2021 Wise was named the interim pitching coach of the Angels.

References

External links

1975 births
Living people
American expatriate baseball players in Canada
Anaheim Angels players
Baseball coaches from California
Baseball players from California
Boise Hawks players
Cal State Fullerton Titans baseball players
Edmonton Trappers players
Erie SeaWolves players
Indianapolis Indians players
Major League Baseball pitchers
Midland Angels players
Milwaukee Brewers players
New York Mets players
Salt Lake Stingers players
St. Lucie Mets players
Yarmouth–Dennis Red Sox players
Anchorage Glacier Pilots players